The 2018 Arizona Bowl was a college football bowl game played on December 29, 2018. It was the fourth edition of the Arizona Bowl, and one of the 2018–19 bowl games concluding the 2018 FBS football season. Sponsored by the Nova Home Loans mortgage broker company, the game was officially known as the Nova Home Loans Arizona Bowl.

Teams
The game was played between Arkansas State from the Sun Belt Conference and Nevada from the Mountain West Conference. In prior games between the two programs, Nevada held a 3–2 lead in the series.

Arkansas State Red Wolves

On November 27, bowl organizers announced that Arkansas State would represent the Sun Belt Conference in the Arizona Bowl. The Red Wolves compiled an 8–4 record during the regular season, and were co-champion of the Sun Belt West Division along with the Louisiana Ragin' Cajuns, both of whom had 5–3 conference records.

Nevada Wolf Pack

Nevada received and accepted a bid to the Arizona Bowl on November 29. The Wolf Pack entered the bowl with a 7–5 record (5–3 in conference).

Game summary

Scoring summary

Statistics

References

External links
 
 Box score at ESPN
 NOVA Home Loans Arizona Bowl Highlights: Nevada Wolf Pack vs Arkansas State via YouTube

Arizona Bowl
Arizona Bowl
Arkansas State Red Wolves football bowl games
Nevada Wolf Pack football bowl games
Arizona Bowl
Arizona Bowl